Golf was an event at the Asian Games for the first time in 1982, when the games were held in New Delhi, India.

Editions

Events

Medal table

List of medalists

References

 Medallists from previous Asian Games – Golf

External links
Asian Pacific Golf Confederation 

 
Sports at the Asian Games
Asian Games
Asian Games